Judge Dennis may refer to:

James L. Dennis (born 1936), judge of the United States Court of Appeals for the Fifth Circuit
Samuel K. Dennis Jr. (1874–1953), judge of the Supreme Bench of Baltimore City, Maryland

See also
Justice Dennis (disambiguation)